Two ships of the United States Navy have been named USS Tucson, after the city of Tucson, Arizona.

  was a light cruiser commissioned in 1945, active in the Pacific War for a few weeks before its end, and decommissioned in 1949.
  is a  nuclear attack submarine commissioned in 1995 and in active service.

United States Navy ship names